German submarine U-22 was a Nazi German Type IIB U-boat which was commissioned in 1936 following construction at the Germaniawerft shipyards at Kiel. Her pre-war service was uneventful, as she trained crews and officers in the rapidly expanding U-boat arm of the Kriegsmarine following the abandonment of the terms of the Treaty of Versailles two years before.

Design
German Type IIB submarines were enlarged versions of the original Type IIs. U-22 had a displacement of  when at the surface and  while submerged. She had two shafts and two  propellers.

U-22 was fitted with three  torpedo tubes at the bow, five torpedoes or up to twelve Type A torpedo mines, and a  anti-aircraft gun. The boat had a complement of twentyfive.

War Patrols
During the Second World War, she was mainly deployed for coastal work, a role enforced by her small size and endurance. Thus she was useful for operations in the North Sea and against the British coastal convoys, particularly along the north east seaboard of Great Britain. It was in this region that she scored her first successes, after fruitless operations off the Polish coast during the invasion of that country and a patrol against British shipping coming from Norwegian ports.

On 18 November 1939, she scored her first kill, sinking the trawler Wigmore off the Scottish coast. In December 1940 she laid mines off Blyth, in Northumberland, which claimed two coastal freighters and a naval patrol minesweeper in less than a week. She was then used directly against Scottish convoys in the Moray Firth, during which she achieved her greatest success, torpedoing the British destroyer , which went down with all hands, the cause of her loss only discovered by the British after the war. Shortly afterwards, in thick fog, she sank a Danish ship from the same convoy. These were her final direct victims, although she later claimed another with a mine laid sometime before.

The submarine failed to return from her seventh patrol, for which she had departed on 20 March 1940. There is some indication that she was lost due to an unexplained mine detonation in the Skagerrak. Some suggested, that she might have been rammed by the Polish submarine , which reported crashing into something, but it was a month later (20 June) and newest analyses show, that the Wilk most probably collided with a buoy. Whatever the cause, U-22 and her 27 crew were never seen again, lost somewhere in the North Sea in March 1940.

Summary of raiding history

References

Notes

Citations

Bibliography

External links
 
 

German Type II submarines
U-boats commissioned in 1936
Missing U-boats of World War II
U-boats sunk in 1940
World War II submarines of Germany
1936 ships
World War II shipwrecks in the North Sea
Ships built in Kiel
U-boats sunk by mines
Maritime incidents in March 1940